Madness of Youth is a lost 1923 American silent drama film directed by Jerome Storm and starring John Gilbert, Billie Dove and George K. Arthur.

Plot

Cast
 John Gilbert as Jaca Javalie 
 Billie Dove as Nanette Banning 
 D.R.O. Hatswell as Peter Reynolds 
 George K. Arthur as Ted Banning 
 Wilton Taylor as Theodore P. Banning 
 Ruth Boyd as Madame Jeanne Banning 
 Luke Lucas as Mason
 Julanne Johnston as The Dancer

References

Bibliography
 Munden, Kenneth White. The American Film Institute Catalog of Motion Pictures Produced in the United States, Part 1. University of California Press, 1997.

External links

1923 films
1923 drama films
Silent American drama films
Lost American films
Films directed by Jerome Storm
American silent feature films
1920s English-language films
American black-and-white films
Fox Film films
Lost drama films
1923 lost films
Films with screenplays by Joseph F. Poland
1920s American films